Wonju is the most populous city in Gangwon Province, South Korea. Wonju was the site of three crucial battles during the Korean War.

Geography
Wonju sits at the southwestern corner of Gangwon Province, bordering Gyeonggi Province to the west and North Chungcheong Province to the south. Within Gangwon, Wonju borders Yeongwol County to the east and Hoengseong County to the north. Unlike much of Gangwon Province, Wonju is not a mountainous area, but rather a basin along the wide plain created by the Seom River.

Administrative divisions
Wonju City is divided into 1 eup (town), 8 myeon (townships), and 16 dong (neighborhoods).

Transportation

 
 
 Manjong station
 Wonju station 
 Seowonju station
 Wonju Airport

Education
 Gangneung-Wonju National University
 Halla University
 Sangji University
 Yonsei University
 Kyungdong University

There is one international school: Wonju Chinese Primary School.

According to data released by Wonju City Hall in 2015, the number of kindergartens located in Wonju was 71.

There are 48 elementary and 22 middle schools, respectively.

In the case of high schools, there are 15 general high schools, 2 special purpose high schools, and 3 specialized high schools, a total of 20.

Culture
The total ride journey is about 40 minutes, offering scenic views of the surrounding mountains while cycling.

Museums
Mureung Museum
Yonsei University Wonju Museum
Museum yetchaek towns
Wonju City Museum
Chiak Folk Museum
Myeongjusa Chiaksan and Engraving Museum
Toji Literature park
Toji Cultural Center
Hanji museum
On Museum of the Arts
Museum San

Libraries 

 Wonju City Library

 Taejang Library

 Jungcheon Philosophical Library

 Wonju Education and Culture Center

 Munmak Library

Climate
The climate of Wonju is a hot-summer, monsoon-influenced Humid continental climate (Köppen: Dwa).

Sports
Wonju is home city of the Wonju DB Promy, playing in the Korean Basketball League. Their home arena is Wonju Gymnasium, which is located in Myeongnyun il-dong, Wonju. The team has won the Championship three times (2002–03, 2004–05, and 2007–08).

Sister cities
  Roanoke, Virginia, United States
  Edmonton, Alberta, Canada
  Yantai, Shandong, China
  Hefei, Anhui, China
  Ichikawa, Chiba, Japan
  Belfast, Northern Ireland

Notable people from Wonju
 Kwon In-sook (Hangul: 권인숙), South Korean feminist scholar, activist and former labor organizer
 Kim Seon-dong (Hangul: 김선동), South Korean politician and Secretary-General of the United Future Party (UFP)
 Jee Yong-ju (Hangul: 지용주), South Korean amateur boxer
 Kim Jae-woong (Hangul: 김재웅), South Korean football midfielder
 Kim Ji-woong (Hangul: 김지웅) , South Korean actor and singer
 Yoon Jin-hee (Hangul: 윤진희), South Korean weightlifter
 Heechul (Real Name: Kim Hee-chul, Hangul: 김희철), singer-songwriter, dancer, model, actor, speaker, MC and K-pop idol, member of K-pop boy group Super Junior, member of its subgroup Super Junior-T, member of the project groups Universe Cowards and Woojoo jjokkomi and former member of pop rock duo Kim Heechul & Kim Jungmo
 Kim Do-yeon (Hangul: 김도연), actress and former member of disbanded K-pop girl group I.O.I, K-pop girl group Weki Meki's lead vocalist and visual
Yoon Ji-sung, South Korean singer and actor, former member of disbanded K-pop boy group Wanna One
 Sojung (Real Name: Lee So-jung, Hangul: 이소정), singer, dancer, model and K-pop idol, member of K-pop girlgroup Ladies' Code
 Joo Won Ahn (Hangul: 안주원), South Korean ballet dancer
 Ahn Young-mi (Hangul: 안영미), South Korean comedian and member of K-pop girl group Celeb Five
 Choi Kyu-hah (Hangul: 최규하), South Korean politician and former President of South Korea
 Chai-Sik Chung (Hangul: 정채식), Korean-American social ethicist and sociologist of religion
 Ham Deok-ju (Hangul: 함덕주), South Korean professional baseball pitcher (Doosan Bears, Korea Baseball Organization)
 Han Dong-jin (Hangul: 한동진), South Korean footballer (Jeju United FC, K League 2)
 Shin Yu-na (Hangul: 유나), member of K-pop girl group ITZY

Notes

References

Citations

Bibliography
 .

External links

  Wonju city government home page
 Wonju city government home page

 

 
Cities in Gangwon Province, South Korea
힐스테이트 원주 레스티지